Wyong Musical Theatre Company (founded in 1996) is an Australian incorporated, not for profit, amateur musical theatre company situated on the Central Coast of Wyong, New South Wales.

History

Early Years 
Prior to the foundation of Wyong Musical Theatre Company, Sandra Plowright, the founding member of the company, had a desire to bring musical theatre to the northern end of the Central Coast which, she felt, for years had been lacking on this part of the coast. In 1995 Sandra formed a committee of associates, with herself as president, with the goal of establishing a musical theatre company. Also on the committee were Michael Burke (Vice President), Pam Issacs (Treasurer), Carl Martin and Greg Derry (Floor Members). She and the committee began lobbying Wyong Shire Council and Councilors, along with Local Businesses, for support of this venture. Sandra was successful in gaining enough support and sponsorship from the local community to be able to mount an inaugural musical production of Guys and Dolls in 1996 which was performed in September of that year at the Wyong Memorial Hall. This production had as its Director Michael Burke, Musical Director Greg Derry and Choreographer Beverly Durkin. From that year on the Company strived to produce two adult productions each year with all participating personnel, volunteering their time and efforts freely for the production. In the 28 years since its foundation, no member of the company has been paid for their services.

Further Developments 
Over the years Wyong Musical Theatre Company has also extended itself to include a Youth Theatre component in which suitable production for young people up to the age of 17 is staged. The first of these productions was The Lion, the Witch and the Wardrobe in 2004. Since then Wyong Musical Theatre Company has endeavored to produce at least one youth production each year.

Another extension to the company's interests was the establishment of a vocal harmony group entitled Encore (formed in 2011) who, over the years, have performed at many functions including local Anzac Day and Australia Day ceremonies as well as private functions. Its aim is to provide performance opportunities while developing harmony singing techniques and encouraging musical and performance development of participating members.

Productions

References

External links

1996 establishments in Australia
Theatre companies in Australia